This article lists a selection of works created by Gürdal Duyar.

Sculptures

Paintings

Sketches

References

Notes

Citations

Sources 

 
 

 
 
 
 
 
 
 
 
 
 

 
 
 
 

 
 

 

Gürdal Duyar